Merryl Lawton is a Canadian politician. He represented the electoral district of Digby in the Nova Scotia House of Assembly from 1984 to 1988. He was a member of the Progressive Conservative Party of Nova Scotia.

Lawton entered provincial politics in the 1984 election, winning the Digby riding by almost 1,800 votes. He did not seek re-election in 1988.

References

Living people
Progressive Conservative Association of Nova Scotia MLAs
People from Digby County, Nova Scotia
1949 births